Anthothoe is a genus of sea anemones in the family Sagartiidae.

Species
Species in the genus include:
 Anthothoe affinis (Johnson, 1861)
 Anthothoe albens (Stuckey, 1909)
 Anthothoe albocincta (Hutton, 1879)
 Anthothoe australiae (Haddon & Duerden, 1896)
 Anthothoe australiensis Carlgren, 1950
 Anthothoe chilensis (Lesson, 1830)
 Anthothoe neozelanica (Carlgren, 1924)
 Anthothoe olivacea (Hemprich & Ehrenberg in Ehrenberg, 1834)
 Anthothoe panamensis Carlgren, 1951
 Anthothoe similis (Haddon & Duerden, 1896)
 Anthothoe stimpsonii (Verrill, 1870)
 Anthothoe vagrans (Stuckey, 1909)
 Anthothoe vincentina (Pax, 1922)

References

Sagartiidae
Hexacorallia genera